A list of films produced by the Marathi language film industry based in Maharashtra in the year 1939.

1939 Releases
A list of Marathi films released in 1939.

References

External links
Gomolo - 

Lists of 1939 films by country or language
1939
1939 in Indian cinema